The Third Battle of Murfreesboro, also known as Wilkinson Pike or the Cedars, was fought December 5–7, 1864, in Rutherford County, Tennessee, as part of the Franklin-Nashville Campaign of the American Civil War.

Background
In a last, desperate attempt to force Maj. Gen. William T. Sherman's Union army out of Georgia, Gen. John Bell Hood led the Army of Tennessee north toward Nashville in November 1864. After suffering terrible losses at Franklin, he continued toward Nashville. Hood recognized that Federal forces at Murfreesboro posed a significant threat to his right flank, his supply line and his possible retreat route. On December 4, 1864 he sent Maj. Gen. Nathan Bedford Forrest with two cavalry divisions and Maj. Gen. William B. Bate's infantry division to Murfreesboro, Tennessee.

Opposing forces

Union
District of Tennessee – Maj. Gen. Lovell H. Rousseau
Defenses of the Nashville & Chattanooga Railroad – Maj. Gen. Robert H. Milroy
1st Provisional Brigade – Col. Minor T. Thomas
8th Minnesota Infantry: Col. Minor T. Thomas, Ltc Henry C. Rogers
61st Illinois Infantry: Lt. Col. Daniel Grass
174th Ohio Infantry: Col. John S. Jones
181st Ohio Infantry: Col. John O'Dowd
13th New York Light Artillery: Cpt. Henry Bundy
2nd Provisional Brigade (Post of Tullahoma) – Col. Edward Anderson
177th Ohio Infantry: Col. Arthur T. Wilcox
178th Ohio Infantry: Col. Joab A. Stafford
12th Indiana Cavalry: Col. Edward Anderson
5th Tennessee Cavalry: Col. William Brickly Stokes

Confederate
Forrest's Cavalry Corps: Maj. Gen. Nathan B. Forrest

Buford's Division: Brig. Gen. Abraham Buford

Bell's Brigade: Col. Tyree H. Bell

2nd/22nd Tennessee Cavalry (Barteau's)

19th Tennessee Cavalry

20th Tennessee Cavalry: Col Robert M. Russell

21st Tennessee Cavalry

Nixon's (22nd) Tennessee Cavalry

Crossland's Brigade: Col. Edward Crossland

3rd Kentucky Mounted Infantry

7th Kentucky Mounted Infantry

8th Kentucky Mounted Infantry

12th Kentucky Cavalry

Huey's Kentucky Battalion

Jackson's Division: Brig. Gen. William Hicks Jackson

Armstrong's Brigade: Brig. Gen. Frank C. Armstrong

1st Mississippi Cavalry

2nd Mississippi Cavalry

28th Mississippi Cavalry

2nd Mississippi Partisan Rangers

Ross's Brigade: Brig. Gen. Lawrence S. Ross

3rd Texas Cavalry

6th Texas Cavalry

9th Texas Cavalry

(1st Texas Legion) 27th Texas Cavalry

Attached Infantry:

(From Cheatham's Corps) Bate's Division: MG William B. Bate

Tyler's/Smith’s Brigade: BG Thomas Benton Smith

37th Georgia

4th Georgia Sharpshooters Battalion

2nd Tennessee

10th Tennessee

20th Tennessee

37th Tennessee

Finley's/Bullock’s Brigade: BG Robert Bullock (w); Major Jacob A. Lash

1st-3rd Florida

4th Florida & 1st Florida Cavalry (dismounted): Major Jacob A. Lash

6th Florida

7th Florida

Jackson's Brigade: BG Henry R. Jackson

(36th Georgia) 1st Georgia Confederate

25th Georgia

29th Georgia

30th Georgia

66th Georgia

1st Georgia Sharpshooters Battalion

(From Lee’s Corps) Stevenson's Division: BG Joseph B. Palmer

Brown's & Reynolds' Brigade: BG Joseph B. Palmer

58th North Carolina

60th North Carolina

54th Virginia

63rd Virginia

3rd-18th Tennessee

23rd-26th-45th Tennessee: Col Anderson Searcy

32nd Tennessee: Col John P. McGuire

(From Stewart’s Corps) French's Division: BG Claudius W. Sears

Sears' Brigade: BG Claudius W. Sears

4th Mississippi

35th Mississippi

36th Mississippi

39th Mississippi

46th Mississippi

7th Mississippi Battalion

Artillery:

Slocomb's Louisiana Battery: Lt. Joseph E. Chalaron

Battle
On December 2, Hood had ordered Bate to destroy the railroad and blockhouses between Murfreesboro and Nashville and join Forrest for further operations. On December 4, Bate's division attacked Blockhouse No. 7 protecting the railroad crossing at Overall's Creek, but Union forces fought it off. On the morning of December 5, Forrest marched toward Murfreesboro in two columns, one to attack the fort on the hill and the other to take Blockhouse No. 4, both at La Vergne. Forrest demanded the garrisons at both locations surrender, which they did. Outside La Vergne, Forrest joined Bate's division and the command advanced on to Murfreesboro along two roads, driving the Union forces into their Fortress Rosecrans fortifications, then encamped in the city outskirts for the night. The next morning, on December 6, fighting flared for a couple of hours, but the Union troops ceased firing and both sides glared at each other for the rest of the day. Brig. Gen. Claudius W. Sears's and Brig. Gen. Joseph B. Palmer's infantry brigades joined Forrest's command in the evening, further increasing his numbers.

On the morning of December 7, Maj. Gen. Lovell Rousseau, commanding all of the forces at Murfreesboro, sent two brigades out under Brig. Gen. Robert H. Milroy on the Salem Pike to feel out the enemy. These brigades were led by Col. Minor T. Thomas, a veteran of the Dakota War, and Col. Edward Anderson. With Thomas' brigade forming the first line of battle and Anderson forming the second, Milroy engaged the Confederates and fighting continued. At one point some of Bate's troops broke and ran. Forrest "seized the colors of the retreating troops and endeavored to rally them". Bate was equally unsuccessful. The rest of Forrest's command conducted an orderly retreat from the field and encamped for the night outside Murfreesboro. Forrest had destroyed railroad track, blockhouses, and some homes and generally disrupted Union operations in the area. More importantly, he succeeded in keeping Rousseau confined to Murfreesboro and kept the important supply line and retreat route open.

References

Sources
 Eicher, John H., and David J. Eicher. Civil War High Commands. Stanford, CA: Stanford University Press, 2001. .
National Park Service battle description

Murfreesboro III
Murfreesboro III
Murfreesboro III
Murfreesboro III
Rutherford County, Tennessee
Murfreesboro
1864 in Tennessee
December 1864 events